Diocese of Singapore and Malaya was an Anglican diocese which covered Singapore and West Malaysia (which 
was also called Malaya). It was renamed from Diocese of Singapore on 6 February 1960.  On 8 April 1970, the diocese was dissolved and split into Diocese of Singapore and Diocese of West Malaysia.

Bishops

See also
Diocese of Singapore (1909)
Diocese of West Malaysia
Anglican Diocese of Singapore
Anglican Communion
Anglicanism

References

Singapore and Malaya
Singapore and Malaya
1960 establishments in Malaya
1970 disestablishments
Singapore and Malaya